The Colquiri mine is an underground tin-zinc mine located in the western part of Bolivia in La Paz Department. Colquiri is the smaller of two tin mines owned by the state mining company, Comibol, the other being the Huanuni tin mine near Oruro.

References 

Tin mines in Bolivia
Mines in La Paz Department (Bolivia)